Michael Arthur "Mike" Lauen (born February 9, 1961) is a former professional ice hockey player who played four games in the National Hockey League during the 1983–84 season. He played for the Winnipeg Jets.

Career statistics

Regular season and playoffs

International

External links

1961 births
Living people
American men's ice hockey forwards
Ice hockey players from Minnesota
Sportspeople from Edina, Minnesota
Michigan Tech Huskies men's ice hockey players
Sherbrooke Canadiens players
Sherbrooke Jets players
Toledo Goaldiggers players
Winnipeg Jets (1979–1996) draft picks
Winnipeg Jets (1979–1996) players